Justicia oncodes is a plant native to the Cerrado vegetation of Brazil.

External links
 Poikilacanthus oncodes

oncodes
Flora of Brazil